Vytautas Norkus (28 January 1921 – 29 January 2014) was a Lithuanian-born American basketball player. He won a gold medal with the Lithuania national basketball team during EuroBasket 1939.

Biography
He studied at Kaunas Aušra boys gymnasium. From 15 years old he started to play basketball. Later in Vytautas Magnus University he studied physical education. He also played for Kaunas "Grandies" team, later for Kaunas "Perkūnas".

He was invited to join Lithuania national basketball team and participate in EuroBasket 1939. He became EuroBasket champion that year. Spectators were pleased to see combination performed by him along with Vytautas Budriūnas and Pranas Lubinas.

At the end of World War II he moved to Germany, where he played for Kempton Šarūnas Lithuanian emigrants basketball team. In 1949 he moved to United States.

References

Sources
 Jungtinių Amerikos Valstijų lietuviai. (II t.) – Mokslo ir enciklopedijų leidybos centras, Vilnius, 1998
 Vidas Mačiulis, Vytautas Gudelis. Halė, kurioje žaidė Lubinas ir Sabonis. 1939–1989 – Respublikinis sporto kombinatas, Kaunas, 1989

1921 births
2014 deaths
Place of birth missing
FIBA EuroBasket-winning players
Lithuanian men's basketball players
Soviet expatriates in Germany
Soviet emigrants to the United States